Bolivia–Peru relations refers to the current and historical relationship between Bolivia and Peru. Both nations are members of the Community of Latin American and Caribbean States, Group of 77, Organization of American States, Organization of Ibero-American States and the United Nations.

History
Both Bolivia and Peru share a common history in the fact that both nations were once part of the Inca Empire and then as part of the Spanish Empire. During Spanish colonialism, Peru was governed by the Viceroyalty of Peru in Lima while the territory of Bolivia was split between the Viceroyalty of Peru and the Viceroyalty of the Río de la Plata in Buenos Aires. Soon after gaining independence from Spain, both nations joined to create the short-lived Peru–Bolivian Confederation. In 1839, both nations became independent nations. In 1879, both nations were allied against Chile during the War of the Pacific. At the end of the war, as a result, Bolivia lost all of its territory (Litoral Department) with access to the Pacific Ocean to Chile.

Relations between both nations have remained close and both nations work together in South American multilateral organizations. There have been numerous visits between leaders of both nations. In 2010, Peruvian President Alan García agreed to allow Bolivia to build a port south of Peru's port of Ilo.

Resident diplomatic missions

 Bolivia has an embassy in Lima and consulates in Cusco, Ilo, Puno and Tacna.
 Peru has an embassy in La Paz and consulates-general in Cochabamba and Santa Cruz de la Sierra and a consulate in El Alto.

See also 
 Peru–Bolivian Confederation
 Treaty of Defensive Alliance (Bolivia–Peru)
 List of ambassadors of Peru to Bolivia

References

External links
 Archives for Peru-Bolivia relations Peruvian Times

 
Peru
Bilateral relations of Peru